The California Derby is a race for Thoroughbred horses held early in the year at Golden Gate Fields.  An ungraded stakes, it is open to three-year-olds at a distance of one and one-sixteenth miles on a Tapeta surface.  The Derby offers a purse of $100,000.

Northern California's first major test for horses hoping to run for the Triple Crown, the California Derby is also the main local prep race for the $200,000 El Camino Real Derby also run at Golden Gate.

The California Derby has been run since 1873.  At that time it was set at twelve furlongs or a mile and a half and was won by Camilla Urso.    Mollie McCarty won the 1876 edition and in 1909, African-American jockey James Lee won the race aboard High Private. Royal Orbit, who ran third in the California Derby, won the 1959 Preakness, and in 1909 Joe Madden, who ran second in the California Derby to High Private, won the Belmont Stakes.  The 1996 winner, Pike Place Dancer won the Kentucky Oaks.

Winners of the California Derby since 1991

Winners before 1991
 1990 - Stalwart Charger
 1989 - Endow
 1988 - All Thee Power
 1987 - Simply Majestic
 1986 - Vernon Castle
 1985 - Hajjis Treasure
 1984 - Distant Ryder
 1983 - Paris Prince
 1982 - Rockwall
 1981 - Always a Cinch
 1980 - Jaklin Klugman 
 1979 - Beau's Eagle
 1978 - Noble Bronze
 1977 - Cuzwuzwrong
 1976 - Telly's Pop
 1975 - Diabolo
 1974 - Agitate
 1973 - Linda's Chief
 1972 - Quack
 1971 - Unconscious 
 1970 - George Lewis
 1969 - Jay Ray
 1968 - Proper Proof
 1967 - Reason to Hail
 1966 - Tragniew
 1965 - Perfect Sky
 1964 - Real Good Deal
 1963 - On My Honor
 1962 - Doc Jocoy
 1961 - Mr. Consistency
 1960 - Noble Noor
 1959 - Finnegan
 1958 - Nice Guy
 1957 - NOT RUN
 1956 - No Regrets
 1955 - Trackmaster
 1954 - Miz Clementine 
 1949 - 1953 - NOT RUN
 1948 - May Reward
 1947 - NOT RUN
 1946 - War Spun
 1945 - NOT RUN
 1944 - Jade Boy
 1942 & 1943 - NOT RUN
 1941 - Pirate
 1939 & 1940 - NOT RUN
 1938 - Grim Reaper
 1937 - Rockwood
 1936 - Lloyd Pan
 1935 - Toro Flight
 1923 - Victoire
 1910 - Turrets
 1909 - High Private 
 1908 - Meelick
 1907 - Temaceo
 1906 - Good Luck
 1905 - Dr Leggo
 1904 - Bombardier
 1903 - Claude
 1902 - Sombrero 
 1901 - Joe Frey
 1900 - NOT RUN
 1899 - Corsini 
 1898 - Traverser
 1897 - Scarborough
 1890 - Muta
 1889 - Hotspur
 1888 - Peel
 1887 - Jim Duffy
 1886 - May Blossom
 1885 - Ned Cook
 1884 - Phillip S
 1883 - Augusta E
 1882 - Duke of Monday
 1881 - Jim Douglas
 1880 - Sally Black 
 1879 - Sister Anne
 1878 - Mark L
 1877 - Lena Dunbar 
 1876 - Mollie McCarty
 1875 - Bradley 
 1874 - NOT RUN
 1873 - Camilla Urso

References
 The California Derby at Pedigree Derby

Horse races in California
Golden Gate Fields
Restricted stakes races in the United States
Recurring sporting events established in 1873
Triple Crown Prep Races
1873 establishments in California